The Strâmbul Băiuț is a right tributary of the river Lăpuș in Romania. It flows into the Lăpuș in the village Strâmbu-Băiuț.

References

Rivers of Romania
Rivers of Maramureș County